Amy Pirnie (born 6 May 1993) is a Scottish Nak Muay and kickboxer, who has most recently competed with Yokkao and Enfusion. She is the reigning Lion Fight super-flyweight champion, and the reigning ISKA strawweight world champion.

She is the former World Boxing Council Muaythai International flyweight champion and the former Enfusion 52 kg Champion. 

In 2015, 2016 and 2019, the UK Muay Thai Awards voted her the best female fighter of the year. She has throughout her career been considered as one of the best female kickboxers in the world.

Kickboxing career

Amateur career
Amy Pirnie began training in muay thai and kickboxing at 12 years old when she met her current coach Rab Izat at the Phoenix Thai Boxing Club in Glasgow. Three years later, at 15 years old, she participated in the IFMA World Championships where she won the junior gold medal. Next year, she won the junior and adult gold medal.

Professional career
In 2008, following her IFMA title win, she made her pro debut for the ISKA British 53 kg title, against Sofia Christodoulou. She won the fight by decision to clinch her first pro title.

In 2011 she faced the WAKO world titlist Silvia La Notte, during Night Kick Out 5. She suffered her first professional loss, by way of DQ.

Following this loss, she went on a seven fight winning streak, culminating with a fight versus Barbara Bontempi for the WBC Muaythai International title. She won the fight in the fourth round by TKO.

After a win against Dakota Ditcheva, she faced Monica Santos for the ISKA world flyweight title. She won the fight in the third round by KO.

Pirnie was scheduled to face Aline Seiberth at Enfusion 68 on June 9, 2019. She won the fight by a first-round knockout.

Pirnie fought a rematch with Silvia La Notte for the Enfusion 52 kg championship at Enfusion 80 on March 23, 2019. She won the fight by unanimous decision.

Pirine fought Sandra Godvik for the inaugural Lion Fight super-flyweight championship at Lion Fight 54 on April 20, 2019. She won the fight by a first-round knockout.

Pirnie was scheduled to make her first Lion Fight super-flyweight title defense against Loomanee W. Santai at August 31, 2019. Pirnie won the fight by split decision.

Pirnie was scheduled to defend her ISKA flyweight world championship against the 2019 IFMA champion Tessa Kakkonen at Total Fight Night 4 on October 12, 2019. Pirnie won the fight by unanimous decision.

Pirnie was scheduled to make her second Lion Fight title defense against Lara Fernandez at Lion Fight 68 on August 22, 2021. She won the closely contested bout by split decision.

Championships and accomplishments

Amateur titles
International Federation of Muaythai Associations
 2008 IFMA Junior World Championship 
 2009 IFMA Junior World Championship 
 2009 IFMA Adult World Championship

Professional titles
World Boxing Council Muaythai
WBC Muaythai Flyweight International championship (One time, former)
International Sport Karate Association
ISKA Super Flyweight British championship (One time, former)
ISKA Strawweight world championship
One successful title defense
Enfusion
Enfusion 52 kg World Championship
Lion Fight
Lion Fight super-flyweight Championship 
Two successful title defenses

Awards
U.K. Muay Thai Awards
2015 Female Fighter of the Year
2016 Female Fighter of the Year
2019 Female Fighter of the Year

Kickboxing record

|-  bgcolor=
|-  bgcolor="#CCFFCC"
| 2021-08-22 || Win ||align=left| Lara Fernandez || Lion Fight 68|| Glasgow, Scotland || Decision (Split) || 5 || 3:00 || 23–3–1
|-
! style=background:white colspan=9 |
|-  bgcolor="#CCFFCC"
| 2019-10-12 || Win||align=left| Tessa Kakkonen || Total Fight Night 4 || Lahti, Finland || Decision (Unanimous) || 5 || 3:00|| 22–3–1
|-
! style=background:white colspan=9 |
|-
|-  bgcolor="#CCFFCC"
| 2019-08-31 || Win||align=left| Loomanee W. Santai || Lion Fight 59 || Gothenburg, Sweden || Decision (Unanimous) || 5 || 3:00|| 21–3–1
|-
! style=background:white colspan=9 |
|-
|-  bgcolor="#CCFFCC"
| 2019-06-08 || Win||align=left| Cindy Silvestre || Blackpool Rebellion || Promenade, United Kingdom || KO (Left hook to the body) || 3 || 3:00|| 20–3–1
|-  bgcolor="#CCFFCC"
| 2019-04-20 || Win||align=left| Sandra Godvik  || Lion Fight 54 || Albuquerque, New Mexico, United States || KO (Knee to the body) || 1 || 1:47|| 19–3–1
|-
! style=background:white colspan=9 |
|-
|-  bgcolor="#CCFFCC"
| 2019-03-23|| Win||align=left| Silvia La Notte || Enfusion 80 || Rome, Italy || Decision (Unanimous) || 5 || 3:00|| 18–3–1
|-
! style=background:white colspan=9 |
|-
|-  bgcolor="#CCFFCC"
| 2018-06-09 || Win||align=left| Aline Seiberth || Enfusion 68 || Newcastle, United Kingdom || KO (Knee to the body) || 1 || 3:00|| 17–3–1
|-  bgcolor="#CCFFCC"
| 2018-03-10 || Win||align=left| Ilenia Perugini || Yokkao 30 || Bolton, United Kingdom || Decision (Unanimous) || 3 || 3:00|| 16–3–1
|-  bgcolor="#CCFFCC"
| 2017-10-15 || Win||align=left| Josefine Lindgren Knutsson || Yokkao 28 || Bolton, United Kingdom || Decision (Unanimous) || 3 || 3:00|| 15–3–1
|-  bgcolor="#CCFFCC"
| 2017-03-13 || Win||align=left| Monica Santos || Ultimate Muay-Thai 4 || Paisley, United Kingdom || KO (Right hook to the body) || 3 || 3:00|| 14–3–1
|-
! style=background:white colspan=9 |
|-
|-  bgcolor="#CCFFCC"
| 2017-03-25 || Win||align=left| Dakota Ditcheva || Yokkao 24 || Bolton, United Kingdom || Decision (Unanimous) || 3 || 3:00|| 13–3–1
|-  bgcolor="#CCFFCC"
| 2016-11-19 || Win||align=left| Barbara Bontempi || Fight Sport Extreme || Stepps, United Kingdom || KO (Right hook to the body) || 4 || 3:00|| 12–3–1
|-
! style=background:white colspan=9 |
|-
|-  bgcolor="#CCFFCC"
| 2016-10-08 || Win||align=left| Ludivine Lasnier || Yokkao 20 || Bolton, United Kingdom || TKO || 2 || 3:00|| 11–3–1
|-  bgcolor="#CCFFCC"
| 2016-04-30 || Win||align=left| Feride Kirat || Power Of Scotland 21 || Paisley, United Kingdom || TKO || 5 || 3:00|| 10-3-1
|-  bgcolor="#CCFFCC"
| 2016-03-19 || Win||align=left| Fanny Ramos || Yokkao 18 || Bolton, United Kingdom || TKO (Referee stoppage) || 3 || 3:00|| 9–3–1
|-  bgcolor="#CCFFCC"
| 2015-12-12 || Win||align=left| Myriame Djedidi || Fight Sport Extreme || Stepps, United Kingdom || Decision (Unanimous) || 3 || 3:00|| 8–3–1
|-  bgcolor="#CCFFCC"
| 2015-09-19 || Win||align=left| Nicola Kaye || Fight Sport Extreme || Stepps, United Kingdom || Decision (Unanimous) || 3 || 3:00|| 7–3–1
|-  bgcolor="#CCFFCC"
| 2015-07-04 || Win||align=left| Anne Line Hogstad || Stand And Bang || Woking, United Kingdom || Decision (Unanimous) || 3 || 3:00|| 6–3–1
|-  bgcolor="#CCFFCC"
| 2015-03-29 || Win||align=left| Jade Sandlan || Batle Of The Envi 2 || Liverpool, United Kingdom || KO || 2 || 3:00|| 5–3–1
|-  bgcolor="#FFBBBB"
| 2013-07-27 || Loss||align=left| Christi Brereton || || Devon, United Kingdom || Decision (Unanimous) || 5 || 2:00|| 4–3–1
|-  bgcolor="#FFBBBB"
| 2011-11-17 || Loss||align=left| Iman Barlow || || United Kingdom || TKO (Knee to the body) || 3 || 3:00|| 4–2–1
|-  bgcolor="#FFBBBB"
| 2011-02-06 || Loss||align=left| Silvia La Notte || Night Kick Out V || Lucca, United Kingdom || DQ || 3 || 3:00|| 4–1–1
|-  bgcolor="#CCFFCC"
| 2009-10-17 || Win||align=left| Lanchana Green ||  || United Kingdom || Decision (Unanimous) || 3 || 3:00|| 4–0–1
|-  bgcolor="#CCFFCC"
| 2009-05-09 || Win||align=left| Lauren Humphreys || Ladykillers III || United Kingdom || Decision (Unanimous) || 3 || 3:00|| 3–0–1
|-  bgcolor="#CCFFCC"
| 2008-08-02 || Win||align=left| Karen Martin || || United Kingdom || Decision (Unanimous) || 3 || 3:00|| 2–0–1
|-  bgcolor="#c5d2ea"
| 2008|| Draw||align=left| Iman Barlow ||  || United Kingdom || Decision (Unanimous) || 3 || 3:00|| 1–0–1
|-  bgcolor="#CCFFCC"
| N/A|| Win||align=left| Sofia Christodoulou ||  || United Kingdom || Decision (Unanimous) || 3 || 3:00|| 1–0
|-
! style=background:white colspan=9 |
|-
|-
| colspan=9 | Legend:

See also
 List of female kickboxers
 List of female ISKA champions

References

External links
 Amy Pirnie at Awakening Fighters
 Amy Pirnie at Muaythai TV

Scottish female kickboxers
Sportspeople from Glasgow
1993 births
Living people
Flyweight kickboxers
Female Muay Thai practitioners